Isaac Adeyemi-Berglund (born May 30, 1996) is a professional Canadian football defensive lineman for the Calgary Stampeders of the Canadian Football League (CFL).

College career
Adeyemi-Berglund first played college football at Champlain College Lennoxville for the Cougars in 2015 where the team won the Bol D'Or Championship. He then transferred to Southeastern Louisiana University in 2016 where he spent a redshirt season for the Lions. He then played for the team from 2017 to 2019 where he recorded 135 tackles, including 28 tackles for a loss, 15 sacks, and six forced fumbles in 33 games played.

Professional career
Adeyemi-Berglund was drafted in the first round, third overall, by the Calgary Stampeders in the 2020 CFL Draft, but did not play in 2020 due to the cancellation of the 2020 CFL season. He then signed his rookie contract with the team on January 26, 2021. After making the team's active roster following training camp, Adeyemi-Berglund played in his first professional game on August 7, 2021, against the Toronto Argonauts, where he had one special teams tackle. He later recorded his first career sack on October 29, 2021, against Caleb Evans of the Ottawa Redblacks. In total, Adeyemi-Berglund dressed in all 14 regular season games in 2021 where he recorded 15 defensive tackles, three special teams tackles, and one sack. He also made his post-season debut in the West Semi-Final that year against the Saskatchewan Roughriders where he posted a career-high five defensive tackles in the Stampeders' loss.

Personal life
Adeyemi-Berglund was born in Dartmouth, Nova Scotia to Robyn Berglund and has a younger brother, Elijah.

References

External links
 Calgary Stampeders bio
 

1996 births
Living people
Calgary Stampeders players
Canadian football defensive linemen
Players of Canadian football from Nova Scotia
Southeastern Louisiana Lions football players
Sportspeople from Dartmouth, Nova Scotia